Zineddine Bourebaba (Évry, 28 September 2002) is a French football player of Algerian descent who usually plays as a midfielder.

Career
Zineddine Bourebaba played in the youth of Savigny Le Temple FC, RC Fontainebleau, Paris FC, AS Monaco and FC Utrecht. In 2020 he made the switch to Jong FC Utrecht, where he made on 14 September 2020 his debut in professional football in the 1-2 lost home game against Jong AZ. He started in the starting line-up and got his second yellow card in the 90+3rd minute and had to leave the field. After a short entrance against Roda JC Kerkrade, his contract with Utrecht was terminated by mutual agreement in early February 2021 due to private circumstances.

Statistics

See also 

 List of Jong FC Utrecht players

References 

2002 births
Living people
French footballers
French expatriate footballers
Association football midfielders
Eerste Divisie players
Paris FC players
AS Monaco FC players
Jong FC Utrecht players
French expatriate sportspeople in the Netherlands
Expatriate footballers in the Netherlands